Włodzimierz Sedlak- was born on 31 October 1911 in Sosnowiec, and died on 17 February 1993 in Radom, Polish priest, professor at John Paul II Catholic University of Lublin, father of Polish bioelectronics and electromagnetic theory of life. Honorary citizen of Sosnowiec, Radom and Skarżysko-Kamienna.

See also
List of Roman Catholic scientist-clerics

People from Sosnowiec
Polish biochemists
20th-century Polish Roman Catholic priests
John Paul II Catholic University of Lublin
Catholic clergy scientists
1911 births
1993 deaths